Dial is a surname. Notable people with the surname include:

Benjy Dial (1943–2001), American football player
Buddy Dial (1937–2008), American football player
Derrick Dial (born 1975), American basketball player
Jeff Dial (born 1976), American politician
Joe Dial (born 1962), American pole vaulter
Nathaniel B. Dial (1862–1940), American politician
Quinton Dial (born 1990), American football player
Thornton Dial (1928–2016), American artist

See also
Dial D. Ryder (1938–2011), American gunsmith